Stéphane Dalmat (born 16 February 1979) is a French former footballer who played as a midfielder. Dalmat was a very versatile player who usually occupied a variety of positions on the midfield. His good ball control and dribbling ability has often seen managers use him wide on the left of midfield, or in the centre as an attacking midfielder. Despite being left footed, he was comfortable with either foot.

Club career
Dalmat was born in Joué-lès-Tours. His first professional match was for Châteauroux against Cannes, which was lost 2–1 on 30 August 1997. He performed well with Châteauroux, and soon a big change was to happen.

He was snapped up by Lens in 1998–99, playing as an attacking central midfielder and earned favourable comparisons to Zinedine Zidane. He quickly moved on to Marseille but, after a dodgy season for the team – where he was often used out of position at left back by a coach he did not get on with, he moved on to Paris Saint-Germain. There he formed a midfield alongside Ali Benarbia and Laurent Robert. After a new coach was installed Dalmat found himself being moved on to Internazionale.

Two-and-a-half seasons of frustration at Inter, during which time he never succeeded in securing an extended run in the team, were followed by a loan move to Tottenham Hotspur for the rest of the 2003–04 season, for what looked like an ideal replacement for Christian Ziege. The playmaker's fortunes did not get much better at White Hart Lane where, despite winning over the Spurs fans with some dynamic performances, he did not win over the confidence of then Coach David Pleat.

His debut for Spurs came on 13 September 2003 as a substitute in a 4–2 defeat at Chelsea. However, he suffered with injuries for most of the season. The highlight of his spell at Spurs was scoring a brace in the 4–1 win over Birmingham in January 2004. He scored one other league goal for Spurs, in the 5–2 win over Wolves in December 2003.

Dalmat's performances in the first three months of the 2003–04 season impressed many but off the field his attitude convinced Tottenham not to make his move permanent.

On his arrival at Toulouse in the summer of 2004, the midfielder declared his reasons behind the switch: “Playing for Toulouse will be a beautiful adventure from both a human and sporting point of view.” Dalmat was outstanding in the early weeks of his Toulouse spell, starting games on the left flank and striking up an understanding with his good friend from his days at Lens, French forward Daniel Moreira.

Relief at rediscovering the sort of form that attracted Inter three years ago disappeared in October 2004, when he fractured a bone in his foot in a friendly match against Nantes. Just days before the injury, Toulouse defender Lucien Aubey had said prophetically: “Some of the players are exhausted because we’ve been playing a match every three days. A guy like Dalmat, who hasn’t played much in recent months, must find it especially hard.”

Dalmat returned to play in the last few months of the season, but Toulouse's bid to seal a European finish had floundered in the absence of Dalmat and Moreira, both of whom missed a large portion of the season through injury.

On 13 July 2005, Racing de Santander announced the signing of Dalmat, on a free transfer signing a five-year deal. Santander followed up his capture with that of his brother Wilfried, who followed Stéphane to El Sardinero, penning a season-long deal.

However, the French midfielder did not have the expected impact at Racing many hoped. The brothers sustained criticism from president Manuel Huerta after returning from their Christmas holidays four days late. The attack on their attitudes appeared to have hastened their exit from the La Liga outfit, but neither were sold by the club during the January 2006 transfer window.

On 14 August 2006 Stéphane Dalmat returned to France signing for Bordeaux on a free transfer. Stéphane Dalmat has since moved again on another free transfer to Sochaux in July 2007.

On 6 July 2012, Dalmat moved to Ligue 2 side Nîmes Olympique from Rennes where he played two seasons, but on 24 July, he announced that he is unable to continue as a player.

International career
At international level, Dalmat has been capped by the France national under-21 football team.

Honours
Lens
Coupe de la Ligue: 1998–99

References

External links
 Stéphane Dalmat's profile, stats & pics

1979 births
Living people
People from Joué-lès-Tours
French people of Martiniquais descent
French footballers
Association football midfielders
France under-21 international footballers
LB Châteauroux players
FC Sochaux-Montbéliard players
FC Girondins de Bordeaux players
RC Lens players
Paris Saint-Germain F.C. players
Olympique de Marseille players
Inter Milan players
Tottenham Hotspur F.C. players
Toulouse FC players
Racing de Santander players
Stade Rennais F.C. players
Ligue 1 players
Serie A players
La Liga players
Premier League players
Expatriate footballers in Italy
Expatriate footballers in Spain
Expatriate footballers in England
French expatriate footballers
Sportspeople from Indre-et-Loire
Footballers from Centre-Val de Loire